John Givens (born January 1870) was a Scottish footballer who played as a striker.

External links
 LFC History profile

1870 births
Scottish footballers
Liverpool F.C. players
Year of death missing
Abercorn F.C. players
Footballers from Glasgow
Place of birth missing
Association football forwards